Mastercutor is the eleventh album by German heavy metal band U.D.O., released on 18 May 2007.

The album title, according to frontman Udo Dirkschneider, is a shortened version of "Master Executor".

Track listing

Credits
Udo Dirkschneider: vocals
Stefan Kaufmann: guitar
Igor Gianola: guitar
Fitty Wienhold: bass
Francesco Jovino: drums

References

2007 albums
U.D.O. albums
AFM Records albums